Six Chuter is an American aircraft manufacturer, originally based in Yakima, Washington and founded in 1991. The company specializes in the design and production of powered parachutes. The company was founded as Six Chuter Inc by Dan Bailey. 

In 2010 the company was purchased, the name changed to Six Chuter International LLC and relocated to Pangborn Memorial Airport, East Wenatchee, Washington.

In 2019 Six Chuter International was purchased from Tom Connley by Stacey and Anita Eaton. The company was relocated to Toquerville, Utah.

Aircraft

References

External links

Aircraft manufacturers of the United States
Powered parachutes
Manufacturing companies established in 1991
1991 establishments in Washington (state)
Manufacturing companies based in Utah
2019 mergers and acquisitions